Putyla Raion was an administrative raion (district) in the southern part of Chernivtsi Oblast in western Ukraine, on the Romanian border. The administrative center of the raion was the urban-type settlement of Putyla. The raion was abolished on 18 July 2020 as part of the administrative reform of Ukraine, which reduced the number of raions of Chernivtsi Oblast to three. The area of Putyla Raion was merged into Vyzhnytsia Raion. The last estimate of the raion population was 

At the time of disestablishment, the raion consisted of four hromadas:
 Koniatyn rural hromada with the administration in the selo of Koniatyn;
 Putyla settlement hromada with the administration in Putyla;
 Seliatyn rural hromada with the administration in the selo of Seliatyn;
 Ust-Putyla rural hromada with the administration in the selo of Ust-Putyla.

See also
Subdivisions of Ukraine

References

External links
 Web page on the website of Regional State Administration 

Former raions of Chernivtsi Oblast
1961 establishments in Ukraine
Ukrainian raions abolished during the 2020 administrative reform